General Sir Rupert Anthony Smith,  (born 13 December 1943) is a retired British Army officer and author of The Utility of Force. He was a senior commander during the Gulf War, for which he was recognised with the award of the Distinguished Service Order (DSO), and again during the Bosnian War, for which he was recognised with the award of a bar to his DSO. He later became Deputy Supreme Allied Commander Europe.

Early life and education
Smith was born in Chelmsford, Essex, England on 13 December 1943, the son of Irving Smith and Joan Debenham. His father was a New Zealand fighter ace in the Battle of Britain who later led No. 487 Squadron RNZAF before rising to group captain in the service of the Royal Air Force.

Smith was educated at the Haileybury and Imperial Service College and later at the Royal Military Academy Sandhurst.

Military career
Smith enlisted in 1962 and graduating from the Royal Military Academy Sandhurst was commissioned as a second lieutenant into the Parachute Regiment in December 1964. He has served in East and South Africa, Arabia, the Caribbean, Northern Ireland, Europe and Malaysia. He was promoted lieutenant in June 1966, captain in December 1970, and major in December 1975. In 1978, when a major, he was awarded the Queen's Gallantry Medal for services in Northern Ireland. 

In June 1980 Smith was promoted to lieutenant colonel and, having been appointed an Officer of the Order of the British Empire in the 1982 New Year Honours, was advanced in June 1985 to colonel. His promotion to brigadier came in December 1986.

In October 1990 Smith was promoted major general and assumed command of the 1st Armoured Division which he led during the Gulf War. For services during the war he was awarded the Distinguished Service Order (DSO), the United States Legion of Merit and the Saudi Order of King Abdulaziz, 3rd Class. The citation for the DSO, published in the London Gazette reads:

He became the first Assistant Chief of Defence Operations and Security at the UK Ministry of Defence in August 1992. While there he was intimately involved in the UK's development of the strategy in Bosnia-Herzegovina. In January 1995 he was granted the acting rank of lieutenant general and appointed Commander Bosnia and Herzogovina Command to command UNPROFOR in Sarajevo. His lieutenant general rank was made substantive in April 1995, and he was awarded a Bar to his DSO in 1996 for his services in Bosnia and Herzegovina. Knighted as a Knight Commander of the Order of the Bath in the 1996 New Year Honours, Smith was General Officer Commanding Northern Ireland from 1996 to 1998. His final assignment, initially as an acting general, was as Deputy Supreme Allied Commander Europe between 1998 and 2001, covering NATO's Operation Allied Force during the  Kosovo war, and the development of the European Security and Defence Identity. His general's rank was made substantive on 1 January 1999. His retirement from the army took effect in January 2002.

He was appointed Honorary Colonel of Exeter University OTC in June 2003 having held periods of tenure as Colonel Commandant Corps of Royal Electrical and Mechanical Engineers (November 1992 to November 1997) and Colonel Commandant The Parachute Regiment (July 1993 to September 1998). He also held the appointment of Aide-de-Camp General to the Queen between August 2000 and November 2001.

Works

He is the author of The Utility of Force: The Art of War in the Modern World (2005), a treatise on modern warfare that explains why the best military forces in the world win their battles but lose the wars. This is due to the paradigm change in military activity, from industrial warfare to the paradigm identified in the book as "war amongst the people"—a situation in which an outcome cannot be resolved directly by military force. The strategies for war amongst the people should be analysed as fighting and winning a linked series of confrontations rather than a series of battles.

References

External links
Interview: Jasper Gerard meets General Rupert Smith for The Times Online
The Utility of Force, book review at The Times Online
The Utility of Force book launch at the Carnegie Council General Sir Rupert Smith Wednesday, 24 January 2007
 Book review in The Guardian
 Book review in The Washington Post

|-
 

1943 births
Military personnel from Chelmsford
Living people
People from Chelmsford
British Army generals
British Army personnel of the Gulf War
British military leaders of the Gulf War
British military personnel of The Troubles (Northern Ireland)
British military writers
British Parachute Regiment officers
Companions of the Distinguished Service Order
Graduates of the Royal Military Academy Sandhurst
Knights Commander of the Order of the Bath
Legionnaires of the Legion of Merit
NATO military personnel
Officers of the Order of the British Empire
People educated at Haileybury and Imperial Service College
Recipients of the Queen's Gallantry Medal
Fellows of King's College London